Alastair Wallis is a former professional Association football right-back who last played for Souths United FC in the Queensland Premier League. He previously played for AmaZulu F.C. in the South African Premier Division and Thanda Royal Zulu F.C. in the National First Division.

Playing career

Club 
Wallis signed for AmaZulu FC in 2009.

During his time at AmaZulu, Wallis attended the 2011 TUNZA African Children's Conference on the Environment.

In 2012 Wallis was loaned to Thanda Royal Zulu in the National First Division for the season.

Ipswich Knights 
Wallis joined Ipswich Knights FC after emigrating to Australia. Wallis showed good form for Knights, before his progress was affected by injuries.

Western Pride 
Wallis joined Western Pride FC late in the 2015 National Premier Leagues Queensland, where he acted as a mentor for a squad largely made up of teenagers.

Later career 
Wallis returned to Ipswich Knights for the 2017 season, where he scored his first senior goal after converting a penalty.

In 2018 he played for Souths United in the newly formed Queensland Premier League, but only made two appearances.

References 

Living people
1989 births
Australian soccer players
South African soccer players
AmaZulu F.C. players
Thanda Royal Zulu F.C. players
Association football fullbacks